Albert Edward Fielder (3 April 1889 – 29 April 1947) was an English first-class cricketer. He was a right-handed batsman who bowled right-arm fast-medium and made his debut for Hampshire against Surrey in the 1911 County Championship, where in his first innings in first-class cricket Fielder took 5/128. Fielder played two more first-class matches for Hampshire, against Gloucestershire, where Fielder took his final first-class wicket and against Leicestershire, where Fielder went wicketless. Fielder made no further first-class appearances after the 1913 season.

Fielder died at Southampton, Hampshire on 29 April 1947.

External links
Albert Fielder at Cricinfo
Albert Fielder at CricketArchive

1889 births
1947 deaths
People from Fareham
English cricketers
Hampshire cricketers